Music for Robots may refer to:

Music
Music for Robots (website) indie music blog
Music for Robots, composition by Peggy Glanville-Hicks 1936
Music for Robots, 1961 LP by Frank Coe and Forrest J Ackerman
Music for Robots (Squarepusher EP)